A barking cough is a symptom name that may refer to:
A harsh cough that sounds somewhat like a dog barking, as with croup
The "Barking cough" is a symptom of asbestosis among the population of and around the former Cape Asbestos Company factory in Barking, east London